Wolf Hollow is a valley in Ste. Genevieve County in the U.S. state of Missouri.

Wolf Hollow was so named on account of wolves in the area.

References

Valleys of Ste. Genevieve County, Missouri
Valleys of Missouri